Fausto Carlos Barreto (December 19, 1852 – October 2, 1915) was a Brazilian philologist, journalist, professor and politician.

Life 

Barreto was born in Tauá, Ceará on December 19, 1852. He began his studies at the Federal University of Ceará, transferring before finishing them to the Federal University of Rio de Janeiro, where he enrolled in 1874 at the School of Medicine. He left shortly before graduating. In 1883, he became a professor of Portuguese language at Colégio Pedro II.

His son, Mário Castelo Branco Barreto, was born on March 17, 1879, and also became a philologist.

He died on October 2, 1915 in Rio de Janeiro.

Politics 

As politician, he was president of the province of Rio Grande do Norte, from July 12 to October 23, 1889. He was also deputy general for Ceará in the last years of the Brazilian Empire.

Linguistic work 

His work as a philologist, mostly related to grammar, has made him one of the foremost experts in the field in his time. He was a corresponding member of the Institute of Ceará.

Works 
(Ed. by Carlos de Laet) Antologia nacional ou collecção de excerptos dos principaes escriptores da lingua portugueza do 19o (20o) ao 16e seculo, Rio de Janeiro, Paulo de Azevedo, 1895 (latest 1989).

References

External links 
 http://www.unicamp.br/iel/memoria/Ensaios/LiteraturaInfantil/fausto.htm (Portuguese)
 http://www.revistas.usp.br/flp/article/view/59771/62880 (Portuguese)

1852 births
1915 deaths
18th-century journalists
18th-century politicians
18th-century philologists
People from Tauá
Linguists from Brazil
Brazilian philologists